Spectacle Pond is a  pond in Wareham, Massachusetts. It is located east and south of Mill Pond, west of Sandy Pond and southwest of Glen Charlie Pond. A small stream connects it to the Agawam River.

External links
Environmental Protection Agency

Wareham, Massachusetts
Ponds of Plymouth County, Massachusetts
Ponds of Massachusetts